Girl Happy is the tenth soundtrack album by American singer and musician Elvis Presley, released on RCA Victor Records in mono and stereo, LPM/LSP 3338, in March 1965 – the March 1 date is disputed. It is the soundtrack to the 1965 film of the same name starring Presley. Recording sessions took place at Radio Recorders in Hollywood, California, on June 10, 11, 12, and vocal overdubs by Presley on June 15, 1964. It peaked at number eight on the Top LP's chart. It was certified Gold on July 15, 1999 by the Recording Industry Association of America.

Content
Excluding the singles compilation Elvis' Golden Records Volume 3, this was the sixth original Presley album in a row that was a soundtrack to a feature film. Eleven songs were recorded and all were used, with "The Meanest Girl in Town" originally released as "Yeah, She's Evil!" by Bill Haley & His Comets and released on Decca Records in July 1964, though Haley actually recorded his version six days after Presley. An error in mastering resulted in Presley's voice being sped up on several of the recordings, most notably the title track. RCA finally released a corrected (though outtake) version of the title track in its 1991 compilation Collectors Gold from the Movie Years. Eventually, the proper speed version was issued.

"Do the Clam" was released approximately a month ahead of the album as a single, peaking at number 21 on the Billboard Hot 100 and remaining on the chart for eight weeks. Its B-side – an unused track called  "You'll Be Gone", written by Presley with "Memphis Mafia" entourage members Red West and Charlie Hodge – was derived from the March 18, 1962 sessions for Pot Luck with Elvis. A variant on the Cole Porter standard, "Begin the Beguine" (after Porter had denied permission to alter the lyrics), the new song was drafted using the Porter tune and lyric as a template. Not appearing in the film, it was added to the Girl Happy soundtrack album.

At the end of 1965, RCA released Harum Scarum the soundtrack album for Elvis's third movie of the year. Due to the fact that none of the songs included in that album had any single potential, RCA chose "Puppet on a String" backed with the five-year-old "Wooden Heart" for the Christmas single. Although "Puppet on a String" had already been available on the Girl Happy soundtrack album for months, that song still managed to reach number 14 on the Billboard Hot 100.

Reissues
In 2003 Girl Happy was reissued on the Follow That Dream label in a special edition that contained the original album tracks along with numerous alternate takes.

Track listing

Original release (1965)

Follow That Dream reissue (2003)

Personnel

 Elvis Presley – vocals
 The Jordanaires – backing vocals
 The Jubilee Four – backing vocals (on "Do the Clam" and "Wolf Call")
 The Carole Lombard Trio – backing vocals (on "Do the Clam" and "Wolf Call")
 Boots Randolph – saxophone
 Scotty Moore – electric rhythm guitar
 Tommy Tedesco – electric lead guitar

 Tiny Timbrell - acoustic guitar
 Floyd Cramer – piano
 Bob Moore – double bass
 D. J. Fontana – drums
Buddy Harman – drums, percussion
Frank Carlson – drums

Charts

Certifications

References

External links

1965 soundtrack albums
Elvis Presley soundtracks
RCA Records soundtracks
Albums produced by Georgie Stoll
Comedy film soundtracks
Musical film soundtracks